Milford is a village in Milford Township, Iroquois County, Illinois, United States. The population was 1,306 at the 2010 census. The village's name comes from its location, where the Old Hubbard Trail forded Sugar Creek and where a gristmill stood in 1836 ("the mill at the ford").

Geography
Milford is located in southeastern Iroquois County along Illinois Route 1, which leads north  to Watseka, the county seat, and south the same distance to Hoopeston in Vermilion County.

Sugar Creek flows westward along the southern edge of the village, before turning north to flow to the Iroquois River near Watseka. It is part of the Kankakee River watershed.

Demographics

As of the census of 2000, there were 1,369 people, 616 households, and 391 families residing in the village. The racial makeup of the village was 99.20% White, 0.44% from other races, and 0.37% from two or more races. Hispanic or Latino of any race were 1.90% of the population.

There were 616 households, out of which 24.7% had children under the age of 18 living with them, 52.6% were married couples living together, 7.8% had a female householder with no husband present, and 36.4% were non-families. 32.3% of all households were made up of individuals, and 16.7% had someone living alone who was 65 years of age or older. The average household size was 2.22 and the average family size was 2.81.

In the village, the population was spread out, with 20.4% under the age of 18, 7.5% from 18 to 24, 25.8% from 25 to 44, 23.6% from 45 to 64, and 22.7% who were 65 years of age or older. The median age was 43 years. For every 100 females, there were 97.8 males. For every 100 females age 18 and over, there were 92.9 males.

The median income for a household in the village was $30,109, and the median income for a family was $40,750. Males had a median income of $29,583 versus $19,453 for females. The per capita income for the village was $19,078. About 4.1% of families and 7.2% of the population were below the poverty line, including 7.6% of those under age 18 and 8.7% of those age 65 or over.

Education

High school athletics
Milford High School, which also brings in students from nearby communities of Stockland, Wellington and Sheldon, fields varsity level teams in; golf, baseball, softball, football, volleyball, cheer leading, and basketball. Teams play under the nickname "Bearcats" (boys) and "Lady Cats" (girls).

Football cooperative agreements:
In the spring of 2009 it was announced that Cissna Park and Milford would form a high school football cooperative to become more competitive.  Previously, the football program had co-oped with Sheldon (from 1993 through Sheldon's becoming part of the Milford school district) and Donovan (in 1997 and 1998).

Gymnasium:  The school was also one of few nationally to feature a carpeted gym floor used for varsity level basketball and volleyball.  The carpet was removed in the summer of 1997 and replaced by a plastic surface manufactured by Sport Court.

Night Football: The Bearcat football team took part in the first night football game in America.  The contest took place on September 21, 1928 in Westville IL.  Westville won the game 26-6. This is recognized by the Illinois High School Association as the first "modern" football game played under lights.

Notable people 

 Joseph R. Callahan, Illinois state representative, farmer, and businessman; born on a farm near Milford
 Ray A. Laird, president of Laredo Community College in Laredo, Texas, 1960 to 1974; born in Milford in 1907
 Eula Davis McEwan, geologist and paleontologist born in Milford, taught at the University of Nebraska
 Claude Rothgeb, outfielder for the Washington Senators, college football, basketball, and baseball coach; born in Milford
 Jessie Sumner, Iroquois county judge, member of the U.S. House of Representatives from Illinois' 18th district through the 76th to 78th US congress

Gallery

References

Villages in Iroquois County, Illinois
Villages in Illinois